Riccardo Idda (born 26 December 1988) is an Italian football player. He plays for  club Virtus Francavilla.

Club career
He spent the first three years of his career in Serie D, before making his professional debut in the 2009–10 season in Serie C2 for Brindisi.

On 15 July 2017, he signed a two-year contract with Serie C club Cosenza. Cosenza advanced to Serie B at the end of the 2017–18 season.

On 5 August 2021, he returned to Virtus Francavilla.

References

External links
 

1988 births
People from Alghero
Footballers from Sardinia
Living people
Italian footballers
Association football defenders
Como 1907 players
S.S.D. Città di Brindisi players
S.S. Villacidrese Calcio players
Casertana F.C. players
Virtus Francavilla Calcio players
Cosenza Calcio players
Serie B players
Serie C players
Serie D players